Hymers College is a co-educational independent day school in Kingston upon Hull, located on the site of the old Botanical Gardens. It is one of the leading schools in the East Riding of Yorkshire and a member of the Headmasters' and Headmistresses' Conference.

The school was founded following the death in 1887 of the Revd Dr John Hymers, Rector of Brandesburton, who left a substantial sum in his will for the founding of a school "for the training of intelligence in whatever social rank of life it may be found among the vast and varied population of the town and port of Hull". Construction of the buildings was completed in 1893, and the first pupils arrived in September of that year. The school, initially open only to boys, expanded to include girls incrementally from the 1970s, becoming fully co-educational in 1989.

Presently, Hymers educates about 950 pupils aged 8–18 across the Junior and Senior Schools, with about 100 members of the teaching staff. The two major intakes of pupils are at age 8, into Year 4, and age 11, into Year 7. Additionally, some pupils enter at 14, into Year 10, and some at 16, into the Sixth Form. Admissions to the school are based on an examination and interview, or a system of academic tracking from ages 5–8 in its associated preparatory school: Hessle Mount in the East Riding of Yorkshire.

Old Hymerians include several prominent sportspeople, diplomats, and academics, including the physicist Dr Edward Milne MBE FRS, who worked on the problem of the expanding universe, alongside Albert Einstein.

History
Hymers College was founded when the mathematician John Hymers left some of his property to the mayor and corporation of Hull in his will of 24 August 1885. The property was to provide for the founding of a grammar school, "for the training of intelligence in whatever social rank of life it may be found among the vast and varied population of the Town." Although an infelicity in the wording of the will rendered the bequest invalid, his brother and heir, Robert Hymers, voluntarily granted the sum of £50,000 to establish the school.

Hymers opened in 1893, on the site of the old Botanic Gardens of Hull, as a school for boys. The school quickly established itself, and the first headmaster, Charles Gore, was soon admitted into the HMC, with all subsequent headmasters also being members. Hymers was a fee-paying school for most of its history, and many scholarships and bursaries were given to pupils whose parents' could not afford the fees, in accordance with John Hymers' will for the training of intelligence, regardless of social rank. In 1946 Hymers became a "direct grant" school, with many pupils being paid for by the local authority, in a similar system to today's academies. However, this scheme ended in 1971, and the school governors chose to become a fully independent school, rather than joining into the new comprehensive system, and re-established the bursaries system after the Government-funded Assisted Places scheme ended in 1997.

From 1972, girls (initially just two) were admitted to the sixth form, and in 1989 the decision was made to become fully co-educational. With the opening of the Humber bridge in 1981, the school's catchment area increased to cover the south bank of the River Humber, resulting in the school's numbers extending to their current figure of just under one thousand pupils in the 1990s.

Primary education
The College has a Junior School which accepts pupils into Years 4, 5 and 6 via an entrance exam, or through the "Associate Schools" program. Hymers currently has two associate schools: Hessle Mount School and Froebel House School, both of which provide education from reception. There is a system of academic tracking with Associate Schools, so that pupils attending these schools do not need to take the entrance exam for entry to the Junior School. Usually, there are just over 200 pupils in all three years of the Junior School (228 in the 2008 ISI report).

In 2003, construction of a new Junior School building was completed, to replace an older building that has since been demolished.

All children are sorted into one of the following four houses at the beginning of Year 4: Brandesburton, Gore, Holderness, and Trinity.

Secondary education
There has been a steady development of buildings and facilities, including design and technology workshops, art studios, language resource rooms, and IT suites. In recent years additional land has been purchased, a theatre (opened by and named after Dame Judi Dench), a music centre, science laboratories, an all-weather sports pitch, and other sports facilities have been constructed. A swimming pool was added in 2005.

The school library was closed in 2001, with the majority of books being redistributed to decentralised resource rooms. This was upon the advice of government inspectors, who argued that the library in its previous form was underused.

A new "Learning Resource Centre" was opened in 2016, in response to an Independent Schools Inspectorate report from 2008, in which it was stated that "[Pupils] are limited in the amount of independent study and research they can undertake while in school... by the absence of a central library resource."

Hymers College is the best performing school in the East Riding in terms of examination results and league-table position, consistently producing an A2 Level pass rate of 99% (updated 2014 figure). In 2018, The Sunday Times' Parent Power publication ranked Hymers College as the 94th best independent school in the country and as one of the top 10 schools in the north of England.

The Masonic lodge Old Hymerian Lodge is linked to the school.

Extra-curricular activities

Sport
Mainstream sports are rugby and cricket, hockey and netball. The school introduced boys' hockey in January 2015. Other sports available include fencing, rounders, tennis, badminton, football, and athletics.

In more recent years the school has produced excellent teams in a wide range of sports, reaching national finals in athletics, girls' hockey, tennis, badminton, and fencing. In 2014 the Independent Sport Magazine ranked Hymers as the 26th best sports school in the country. In December 2016 the school was included in The Cricketer magazine's Top 100 Cricket Schools in the Country.

Music and drama
The Judi Dench Theatre was opened in 1993 and a new Music Centre was opened by John Rutter in September 2014. The new facility contains nine individual music rooms, two classrooms, a recording studio and the Rutter Rehearsal Room. The school's musicians perform at over 35 concerts each year and increasingly take concerts out of school to perform in the local community. In 2013 the Junior School choir performed in the School Choir of the Year for Barnardos and BBC Songs of Praise.
 
Drama is taught to pupils in Years 7 and 8 with youngsters choosing to study it at GCSE and at A Level. Many students appear in the annual school play, which is performed in March each year. In addition, the Department produces plays in the Junior School and throughout the Senior School. Recent productions include Oliver!, Annie, and Les Miserables.

Work in the local community
The school makes a significant contribution to its local community. Hymers is the only independent school in the country to be an official training partner for the National Citizen Service (NCS). The school employs a co-ordinator who oversees the training of around 130 local students before they volunteer 30 hours in their local community. The school's annual contribution to its local community is reported on its website.

Army Cadet Force
Unlike most independent schools who have a Combined Cadet Force unit, Hymers has its own Army Cadet Force detachment currently containing around 10 cadets ranging from recruits to senior NCOs.

Hymers College Royal Logistic Corps detachment is affiliated to 150th Transport Regiment of the Royal Logistic Corps. The detachment is in B Company of Humberside and South Yorkshire Army Cadet Force.

In the early 1990s, a pupil (who was also a cadet at another detachment in Hull) approached a teacher who had previously served in the army and suggested that the college should form its own cadet unit. The detachment's regimental affiliation was uncertain, many old Hymerians had fought during the wars in various units but one above all others featured in the records: the Parachute Regiment. No sponsor Parachute Regiment unit was available. The local (TA) unit was the only option, that was Royal Corps of Transport (TA) in Hull at the time the detachment formed. The detachment had the Royal Corps of Transport cap badge for only a few months before the amalgamation of the Royal Corps of Transport into the Royal Logistic Corps. For many years the detachment made use of the college's biology labs and then the school gymnasium. The gymnasium had space for drill indoors, air rifle shooting as well as a small armoury, which was an improvement on the science labs. The detachment commander became the company commander of E company (South Humberside) while the detachment remained in B company. When the detachment commander became the commander of A company instead of E company the detachment became part of A company (east Hull and eastern part of the East Riding of Yorkshire), this only lasted about a year and the detachment and its commander returned to B company. The detachment moved out of the gymnasium building into a new prefabricated building a couple of years ago. A concrete .22 shooting range has recently been added next to the main building.

The detachment commander was until recently the same teacher who started the detachment in the early 1990s, but in 2007 he was replaced by an external officer, not a teacher from the school. Other adult instructors have also assisted with APC training, some being Old Hymerians. The cadets are taught the same APC subjects at the detachment as all other Army Cadet Force detachments in the UK these include: Skill at Arms, Fieldcraft, and Map and Compass.

This detachment is the only one in the country to have 12 above-standard certificates for its annual inspections. The land on which the detachment is built is on a 99-year lease to the Ministry of Defence and receives no funding from the College.

School associations
The school is supported by a non-profit association, primarily run by parents and Old Hymerians, which host events and provide some funding for new facilities.

Hymers College Association (HCA)
The HCA is a forty-year-old organization, whose primary purpose is to raise funds for the support, expansion and development of the school. It runs a number of annual fundraising events, including a summer Garden Party, a May Ball, second hand uniform sales, and Junior School discos and plays. In September 2016 two other organisations, Friends of Hymers Music (FOHMS) and Supporters of Hymers College Sport (SOHCS), merged with the HCA to form one fundraising organisation.

Items given to the school as a result of HCA funding include the fleet of three minibuses, the ICT suite and outdoor play area in the Junior School, and the equipment in the Fitness Centre (located in the new Sports Centre, alongside the swimming pool).

Former Headmasters

 Charles H. Gore, 1893–1927
 William V. Cavill, 1927–1951
 Harry R. Roach, 1951–1971
 John Ashurst, 1971–1983
 Bryan G. Bass, 1983–1990
 John C. Morris, 1990–2006 
 David C. Elstone, 2006–2019

Old Hymerians

Former pupils are known as Old Hymerians and the Old Hymerians Association exists for their benefit. Some notable old Hymerians are:
Conrad Voss Bark, writer and correspondent 
Tom Biggs, professional rugby player
Michael Bilton, actor 
Major General Graham Binns
Kevin Boyd, Olympic swimmer
John Burgan, Film maker
Paul Callis, British swimmer
Jon Driver, neuroscientist
John Fancy, famed for his many escapes from PoW camps during the Second World War
Peter Fryer Communist journalist
Simon Hoggart, journalist
Ralph Hooper Aeronautical engineer - famous for his work on Harrier and Hawk aircraft
Damian Johnson, British sports broadcaster
John Kittmer, former British ambassador to Greece
Stuart Matthewman
Jemma McKenzie-Brown, professional actress
Edward Arthur Milne, physicist
Alfred Morris, first vice-chancellor of UWE
Peter M. Neumann, Mathematician
Katie O'Brien, professional tennis player
 Anant Parekh , Professor of Physiology at the University of Oxford
David Prutton, professional footballer
John Townend, politician
Rob Vickerman, professional rugby player
Tom Whittaker, professional rugby player
Sir Peter Williams, physicist

References

External links
Website of Hymers College, Hull
Old Hymerians Association website

Member schools of the Headmasters' and Headmistresses' Conference
 
Educational institutions established in 1893
Private schools in Kingston upon Hull
1893 establishments in England